This list of introduced mammal species includes all the species of mammal introduced to an area without regard to that territory being or not being their native area of occupation or the success of that re-introduction or introduction to the area. This practice has been harmful in many areas, although some introductions are made with the aim of preserving mammal species. Following the name of the mammal, a brief description of where they were introduced is included.

Marsupials
Bennett's wallaby successfully introduced to Europe and New Zealand
Brush-tailed rock wallaby unsuccessfully introduced to New Zealand (exterminated by 2014) but was successfully introduced to Hawaii
 Macropus parma (Parma wallaby) successfully introduced to New Zealand
Tammar wallaby successfully introduced to New Zealand
 Wallabia bicolor (swamp wallaby) successfully introduced to New Zealand
Brush-tailed possum successfully introduced to New Zealand
Koala successfully introduced to South Australia
 Didelphis virginiana (Virginia opossum) successfully introduced to California and unsuccessfully introduced to British Isles (no wild population exists)

Horses
Feral horse successfully introduced to USA, Australia, New Zealand, Africa, British isles, Central America, and South America
Feral donkey successfully introduced to Australia, Africa, USA, Cyprus, New Zealand, Central America, Sri Lanka, Oceania
Plains zebra successfully introduced to USA

Rhinos
Southern white rhinoceros successfully introduced to China

Antelopes
Blackbuck successfully introduced to USA and South America
Nilgai successfully introduced to USA and Mexico 
Gemsbok successfully introduced to USA
 Aepyceros melampus (impala) successfully introduced to Gabon
 Connochaetes gnou (black wildebeest) successfully introduced to Namibia 
 Hippotragus niger (sable antelope) successfully introduced to Swaziland 
 Tragelaphus angasii (nyala) successfully introduced to Botswana and Namibia

Pigs
Wild boar successfully introduced to USA, Hawaii, Australia, Africa, South America, New Zealand, Central America, Asia, and Oceania

Cattle and other bovines
Banteng successfully introduced to Australia
Domestic cattle successfully introduced worldwide
Zebu successfully introduced to Africa - considered to be a breed of domestic cattle
Water buffalo successfully introduced to Australia, Brazil, and Oceania
 Bison bison (American bison) successfully introduced to California 
 Bison bonasus (European bison) successfully reintroduced to Europe
 Ovibos moschatus (Greenland muskox) successfully introduced to Scandinavia and Russia

Camels
Dromedary camel successfully introduced to Europe (no wild population exists), Asia (all wild populations exist within the natural range), and Australia, and unsuccessfully introduced to USA (due to the Civil War but captive only)
Bactrian camel successfully introduced to Europe (no wild population exists)

Sheep and Goats
Feral sheep successfully introduced to USA, New Zealand, Tibet, and Oceania
Feral goat/Wild goat successfully introduced to Australia, New Zealand, Hawaii, Africa, North America, British isles, South America, Europe, Asia, and Oceania
Himalayan tahr successfully introduced to USA, South America, New Zealand, and Africa
Mouflon successfully introduced to USA, mainland Europe, South America (on private estates), Hawaii, and Canary Islands 
Barbary sheep successfully introduced to New Mexico, Europe, Mexico, and Canary Islands
Chamois successfully introduced to New Zealand

Hippos
Hippopotamus successfully introduced to Colombia

Deer
Moose introduced to Newfoundland, possibly successfully introduced to New Zealand (no wild population exists, and captive only)
White-tailed deer successfully introduced to New Zealand, Cuba, Jamaica, Hispaniola, Puerto Rico, Bahamas, Lesser Antilles, Finland, Czech Republic and Serbia
Mule deer unsuccessfully introduced to Argentina and Hawaii
American elk successfully introduced to Florida, New Zealand, South America, and Italy 
Chital deer successfully introduced to Hawaii, Australia, Chile, Argentina, Texas, Florida, Mississippi, California, Alabama, and Europe
Fallow deer successfully introduced to Australia, New Zealand, British Isles, North America, Caribbean Islands, South America, and Africa
Sika deer successfully introduced to Europe, British Isles, Africa (captive only), North America, South America (captive only), and New Zealand
Red deer successfully introduced to North America, Australia, New Zealand, South America, and Africa
Chinese water deer successfully introduced to British Isles and France 
Reeve's muntjac successfully introduced to British Isles and Asia 
Indian hog deer unsuccessfully introduced to USA and Australia 
Swamp deer successfully introduced to Texas (captive only)
 Rangifer tarandus (reindeer) successfully introduced to Iceland, South Georgia, and  Ile Australia
 Rusa marianna (Philippine deer) successfully introduced to Guam, Rota, Pohnpei and Saipan
 Rusa timorensis (Javan rusa) successfully introduced to Australia, New Zealand, and Africa
 Rusa unicolor (sambar deer) successfully introduced to Australia, New Zealand, and North America

Mongooses and relatives
Common genet successfully introduced to Europe and unsuccessfully introduced to most of Egypt
Small Asian mongoose successfully introduced to Hawaii, Venezuela, Guyana, Suriname, mainland Europe, Caribbean Islands, Japan, Mauritius, and Fiji and unsuccessfully introduced to British Isles (no wild population exists)
Yellow mongoose successfully introduced to Namibia and South Africa, but not outside of its natural range
Egyptian mongoose successfully introduced to Europe
 Paguma larvata (masked palm civet) successfully introduced to Japan
 Viverricula indica (small Indian civet) successfully introduced to Madagascar

Cats
Feral cat successfully introduced to worldwide, including New Zealand, Hawaii, and others
 Puma yagouaroundi (jaguarundi) successfully introduced to Florida

Dogs
Feral dog successfully introduced to worldwide
Red fox successfully introduced to worldwide, including Australia
Raccoon dog successfully introduced to Europe and Asia
 Canis latrans (coyote) successfully introduced to Florida and Georgia

Mustelids
American mink successfully introduced to Asia and the British Isles, South America, and Europe
Ferret successfully introduced to the British Isles, New Zealand, and Azores
Stoat successfully introduced to New Zealand
 Martes melampus (Japanese marten) successfully introduced to Asia
 Mustela itatsi (Japanese weasel) successfully introduced to Asia
 Mustela nivalis (least weasel) successfully introduced to New Zealand
 Mustela sibirica (Siberian weasel) successfully introduced to Asia

Raccoons and relatives
South American coati unsuccessfully introduced to Europe
 Nasua narica (white-nosed coati) successfully introduced to Florida
Common raccoon successfully introduced to Japan, Europe, Prince Edward Island, and Caribbean Islands

Insectivores
Asian house shrew successfully introduced to Africa and Oceania
 Atelerix algirus (north African hedgehog) successfully introduced to Europe
 Crocidura russula (greater white-toothed shrew) successfully introduced to British isles
 Erinaceus amurensis (Amur hedgehog) successfully introduced to Japan
 Erinaceus europaeus (European hedgehog) successfully introduced to British isles and New Zealand

Monkeys
Barbary macaque successfully introduced to Europe
Rhesus macaque successfully introduced to Florida, South Carolina, the Caribbean islands, and Japan
Japanese macaque unsuccessfully introduced to Texas
Vervet monkey successfully introduced to USA Florida
Patas monkey successfully introduced to Australia (captive only) and Puerto Rico
Common squirrel monkey successfully introduced to Florida
Crab-eating macaque successfully introduced to Africa, Hong Kong, and Oceania
 Cercopithecus mona (mona monkey) successfully introduced to Grenada and São Tomé and Príncipe
 Chlorocebus sabaeus (green monkey) successfully introduced to Central America
 Macaca arctoides (stump-tailed macaque) successfully introduced to Mexico
 Macaca cyclopis (Formosan rock macaque) successfully introduced to Japan

Rodents
Capybara successfully introduced to Florida
Gambian pouch rat successfully introduced to Florida's islands, Gulf coast of USA, and Central America (captive only), and unsuccessfully introduced to mainland Florida
Pacific rat successfully introduced to New Zealand and Hawaii
Black rat successfully introduced to worldwide
Brown rat successfully introduced to worldwide
House mouse successfully introduced to worldwide
Coypu successfully introduced to most of USA, Asia, Europe, and Africa and unsuccessfully introduced to California
Muskrat successfully introduced to Asia, Europe, and South America
Bank vole successfully introduced to British Isles
Edible dormouse successfully introduced to British Isles
Siberian chipmunk successfully introduced to Europe and Asia
Grey squirrel successfully introduced to Europe, British Isles, Africa, and Pitcairn Islands
 Callosciurus finlaysonii (Finlayson's squirrel) successfully introduced to Europe and Japan
 Callosciurus erythraeus (Pallas's squirrel) successfully introduced to Europe and Japan 
 Funambulus pennantii (northern palm squirrel) successfully introduced to Australia
 Sciurus aberti (Abert's squirrel) successfully introduced to non-native areas of Arizona
 Sciurus aureogaster (Mexican red-bellied squirrel) successfully introduced to Florida
 Sciurus niger (fox squirrel) successfully introduced to western US
 Spermophilus parryii (Arctic ground squirrel) successfully introduced to Alaskan islands
North American beaver successfully introduced to South America and Europe
 Castor fiber (European beaver) successfully reintroduced to Finland
African porcupine successfully introduced to Europe (within natural range) and British Isles (captive only)
Himalayan porcupine unsuccessfully introduced to British Isles (captive only)

Rabbits and Hares
Mountain hare successfully introduced to New Zealand, Scandinavia, and Réunion
European rabbit successfully introduced to Australia, North America, Africa, Asia, New Zealand, British isles, South America, and Oceania
European hare successfully introduced to Australia, British Isles, New Zealand, North America, and South America
 Lepus nigricollis (Indian hare) successfully introduced to Africa
 Sylvilagus floridanus (cottontail rabbit) successfully introduced to Europe

See also
List of introduced species
Introduced species
Invasive species
List of invasive species
List of introduced bird species
Introduced species of the British Isles

References

mammals
Mammal ecology
Introduced mammals